Ralph Williams was a magistrate and state legislator in Mississippi. He documented as having been enslaved from birth. He established a wagon manufacturing business in Lamar, Mississippi after the end of the American Civil War in 1866. He served as a magistrate from 1871 until 1873 when he served in the Mississippi House of Representatives  from 1873-1875 for Marshall County, Mississippi.

See also
African-American officeholders during and following the Reconstruction era

References

Year of birth unknown
Year of death unknown
Place of birth unknown
Place of death unknown
American former slaves
Members of the Mississippi House of Representatives
African-American state legislators in Mississippi
African-American politicians during the Reconstruction Era
People from Marshall County, Mississippi
People from Benton County, Mississippi